Leptinotarsa haldemani, commonly known as Haldeman's green potato beetle, is a glossy green-colored species of beetle in the leaf beetle family Chrysomelidae. It was named in honour of Samuel Stehman Haldeman, a 19th-century American entomologist who collected insect specimens in Texas.

Description
This small beetle has a black head, antennae, thorax, and legs. Its general body shape is domed and the elytra are usually deep metallic green, but sometimes metallic purple or blue.

Distribution
This species is found in Mexico, Central America, and the US states of Arizona, New Mexico, Oklahoma, and Texas.

Host plants
This beetle is found on members of the family Solanaceae including wild species of Physalis, Solanum douglasii, and the Anderson thornbush, Lycium andersonii. It is also occasionally found on potatoes.

References

Chrysomelinae
Beetles described in 1856
Beetles of North America